Abraham Ifoghale Odoh (born 25 June 2000) is an English footballer who plays as an attacking midfielder for Rochdale.

Club career

Non-League
Odoh signed for Edgware Town, making a singular cup appearance for the club, before joining Tooting & Mitcham United in 2018,

Charlton Athletic
Odoh signed for Charlton Athletic on loan on 8 February 2019. Odoh joined Charlton permanently at the end of the season. Odoh made his professional debut with Charlton Athletic in a 1-0 FA Cup loss to West Bromwich Albion on 4 January 2020.

On 2 July 2020, it was confirmed that Odoh had left Charlton after his contract expired.

Rochdale
On 26 February 2021, Odoh signed an 18-month contract with Rochdale.

Career statistics

References

External links

CAFC Profile

2000 births
Living people
English footballers
English people of Nigerian descent
Association football midfielders
Edgware Town F.C. players
Tooting & Mitcham United F.C. players
Charlton Athletic F.C. players
Rochdale A.F.C. players
Isthmian League players
English Football League players
Black British sportspeople
People from Lambeth